Wattle Grove may be:
Wattle Grove, New South Wales, Australia
Wattle Grove, Queensland, a locality in the South Burnett Region, Queensland, Australia
Wattle Grove, Tasmania, Australia
Wattle Grove, Western Australia